Temple Hirst railway station served the village of Temple Hirst, North Yorkshire, England from 1871 to 1964 on the East Coast Main Line.

History
The station was opened on 2 January 1871 by the North Eastern Railway. It was closed on 6 March 1961 and closed to goods traffic in 1964.

References

External links

Disused railway stations in North Yorkshire
Former North Eastern Railway (UK) stations
Railway stations in Great Britain opened in 1871
Railway stations in Great Britain closed in 1961
1871 establishments in England
1961 disestablishments in England